SortSite is a web crawler that scans entire websites for quality issues including accessibility, browser compatibility, broken links, legal compliance, search optimization, usability and web standards compliance.

Tests, standards and checkpoints
Quality tests run on each page include:
 Accessibility - W3 WCAG 1.0, 2.0 and Section 508 standards 
 Browser compatibility - check cross-browser compatibility of HTML, CSS and JavaScript (i.e. find code that doesn't work in all browsers)
 Broken links - checks for broken links, missing images and HTTP protocol violations
 Search engine guidelines - Yahoo, Microsoft and Google guidelines - websites violating the guidelines may be removed from the Google index
 Usability - Usability.gov peer-reviewed web usability guidelines
 Web standards - validation of HTML, XHTML and CSS

Reviews
The product has been reviewed in Website Magazine and Softpedia News. The vendor maintains a list of current reviews on their website.

A list of problems commonly encountered by users is provided by the vendor in the "SortSite FAQ" on its website.

Licensing
SortSite is commercial licensed software which uses serial numbers to prevent unlicensed usage. Standard licensing is per-user, but pooled floating licences are also available at extra cost.

See also
 Cross-browser compatibility, making websites work in all browsers
 Web accessibility, making websites available to people of all abilities and disabilities 
 Web usability, making websites easier to use

References

Accessible information
Web accessibility
Web design